G. Vanmikanathan (6 January 1901 – 31 May 1989), better known as G. V. Pillai, was a Tamil scholar, author, founder and organiser of the 'Tirukkural Prachar Sangh'. He is known for translating the Tirukkural into English.

Biography
Vanmikanathan was born in Tiruchirapalli and studied history, economics and Latin in S. P. G College (now Bishop Heber), obtaining a B.A. He served for 30 years in the North Western Railway at Karachi and in central government service in Bombay and Delhi. He retired in 1956 as deputy secretary of the Central Secretariat. The government honoured him with the title of 'Rao Sahib' for his civilian service during the 1939–1946 war.

Vanmikanathan had a scholarly knowledge in Hindi and English, with working knowledge of Sanskrit and Bengali. He studied the Tirukkural and the Tiruvachakam, and in 1969 translated the Kural text into English in prose. He founded the 'Tirukkural Prachar Sangh' at Tiruchirapalli.

See also

 Tirukkural translations
 Tirukkural translations into English
 List of translators into English

References

Further reading
 Manavalan, A. A. (2010). A Compendium of Tirukkural Translations in English (4 vols.). Chennai: Central Institute of Classical Tamil, .

Tamil–English translators
Translators of the Tirukkural into English
1901 births
1989 deaths
20th-century translators
Tirukkural translators